The Roman Catholic Diocese of N’Dali is a diocese located in the city of N’Dali in the Ecclesiastical province of Parakou in Benin.

History
 22 December 1999: Established as Diocese of N’Dali from the Metropolitan Archdiocese of Parakou

Leadership
 Bishop of N’Dali (Roman rite)
 Bishop Martin Adjou Moumouni: since 22 December 1999

See also
 Roman Catholicism in Benin

References

External links
 GCatholic.org 

Roman Catholic dioceses in Benin
Christian organizations established in 1999
Roman Catholic dioceses and prelatures established in the 20th century
N'Dali, Roman Catholic Diocese of
1999 establishments in Benin